Malcolm John Mackenzie (born 30 September 1961) is an English professional golfer.

Mackenzie was born in Sheffield. He turned professional in 1980 and has spent most of his career playing on the European Tour. His best Order of Merit ranking was 25th in 1990, one of twelve times he made the top 100. He has just one European Tour win to his name, the 2002 Novotel Perrier Open de France, achieved during his 20th season and in his 509th appearance on tour.  509 appearances is the European Tour record for a first win: Richard Bland is second with 478 appearances and Roger Chapman is third with 472. He also won the Zimbabwe Open in 1985.

In late 2003, he underwent shoulder surgery and has struggled to recover his form. His last full season on tour was 2005, when he made just three cuts and finished well outside the top 200 on the Order of Merit. In 2006 he became the 4th player to make 600 appearances on the European Tour when he teed it up at the BMW International Open. He has played only a handful of tournaments since then.

Professional wins (2)

European Tour wins (1)

Safari Circuit wins (1)

Results in major championships

Note: MacKenzie only played in The Open Championship.

CUT = missed the half-way cut
"T" indicates a tie for a place

Team appearances
Amateur
Jacques Léglise Trophy (representing Great Britain & Ireland): 1979 (winners)

References

External links

English male golfers
European Tour golfers
European Senior Tour golfers
Sportspeople from Sheffield
People from Barrow upon Soar
Sportspeople from Leicestershire
1961 births
Living people